Tochilkin is a rural locality (a khutor) in Krasnyanskoye Rural Settlement, Kumylzhensky District, Volgograd Oblast, Russia. The population was 148 as of 2010. There are 3 streets.

Geography 
Tochilkin is located in forest steppe, on Khopyorsko-Buzulukskaya Plain, 44 km southeast of Kumylzhenskaya (the district's administrative centre) by road. Chiganaki 2-ye is the nearest rural locality.

References 

Rural localities in Kumylzhensky District